Southern Co-op (originally Portsea Island Mutual Co-operative Society Ltd, now officially The Southern Co-operative Limited) is a regional consumer co-operative in the United Kingdom. The principal activities of the Society are food retailing and funerals. It operates more than 300 convenience stores and funeral homes, covering the southern English counties of Berkshire, Bristol, Buckinghamshire, Devon, Dorset, Hampshire, Isle of Wight, Kent, London, Somerset, Surrey, Sussex and Wiltshire. Southern Co-op society is owned by over 130,000 members who share in the business's profits and democratically control its operations. It was previously registered as an Industrial and Provident Society, but its status is now as a mutual society under the Co-operative and Community Benefit Societies Act 2014.

The business of Southern Co-op includes a natural burial ground in West Sussex, crematoria in Hampshire and Devon, Following the acquisition from Midcounties Co-op in November, they have now expanded into Buckinghamshire and opened funeral homes in High Wycombe, Hazelmere, Wendover and Aylesbury. This increased the total number of funeral homes to 62. Additionally, the Co-op franchises Welcome stores operated by franchisees under the Welcome brand and has a franchise project with Starbucks which has more than 50 stores.

In the full year ending 30 January 2022, Southern Co-op recorded sales of £494m (£490.3m 2020/21) and a profit before tax of £3.3 million (£1.2m 2020/21). Society membership was 138,748 in 2021/22, up from 132,051 in 2020/21. 

29,323 new Members joined Southern Co-op during 2021-22 (5,996 in 2020-21)

During the year 478 accounts were closed upon request and 22,819 accounts forfeited in accordance with the Rules. 671 previously forfeited accounts were re-opened upon request by the Member. The forfeiture process is set out within Southern Co-op's Rules and is an important process to ensure that the membership register remains as accurate as possible.

History
Southern Co-op was formed in 1873 by dockyard workers who had transferred from Woolwich docks in east London to the Portsmouth dockyard. The workers had previously set up a successful Co-operative Society in Woolwich. When they arrived in Portsmouth they decided to replicate a similar set-up there.

In December 1872, 30 people attended a public meeting and unanimously agreed to pay one shilling (12 old pence) for the establishment of a local Co-operative. After five months, the Portsea Island Mutual Co-operative Society's first shop opened in Charles Street on 9 May 1873.

The head office was previously located at Fareham in Hampshire until, July 2011, when it moved to 1000 Lakeside, a business park in North Harbour, Portsmouth.

Operations

Southern co-op operates over 200 Co-operative Food stores, covering Hampshire, the Isle of Wight, Sussex, Berkshire, Somerset, Surrey, Devon, Bristol, Kent and parts of Dorset and Wiltshire. They also operate 50 Starbucks stores which are franchised under Cobra coffee which is owned by Southern Co-op.

Registered in England and Wales under the Co-operative and Community Benefit Societies Act 2014, it is a member of Co-operatives UK, the Co-operative Retail Trading Group and a corporate member of The Co-operative Group.

In July 2022 a legal complaint was made to the Information Commissioner's Office (ICO) over its use live facial recognition cameras.

See also
 British co-operative movement
 Credit unions in the United Kingdom

References

External links
 Official website
 The Southern Co-operative Annual Review

Consumers' co-operatives of the United Kingdom
Retail companies established in 1873